Murai (written:  lit. "village well") is a Japanese surname. Notable people with the surname include:

, Japanese rugby union player
Ernest Isao Murai (1900–1981), Japanese American political official
Hideki Murai (born 1980), Japanese politician
Hideo Murai (1958–1995), member of the Aum Shinrikyo cult
Jin Murai (born 1937), Governor of Nagano Prefecture
Jun Murai (born 1955), Japanese computer scientist
Kazusa Murai (born 1975), Japanese voice actress
Katsuyuki Murai (born 1969), Japanese actor
, Japanese rower
Kenjirō Murai, member of Cali Gari
Kunio Murai (born 1944), Japanese actor and voice actor
Muneaki Murai (born 1973), Japanese politician
Murai Sadakatsu (1528–1582), Japanese samurai
Murai Shimako (born 1928), Japanese playwright
Shinji Murai (born 1979), Japanese football player
Taiki Murai (born 1993), Japanese footballer
, Japanese rower
Yoshihiro Murai (born 1960), Governor of Miyagi Prefecture

See also
Imura

Japanese-language surnames